Meda or the Not So Bright Side of Things (Romanian: Meda sau Partea nu prea fericită a lucrurilor) is a 2017 Romanian drama film directed and written by Emanuel Pârvu, and starring Șerban Pavlu and Ana Radu. The plot follows Doru (Pavlu), a widowed lumberjack living in an isolated village, who struggles earning money so that his foster teenage daughter Meda (Radu) is not sent back to the orphanage. It is the full-length debut of Pârvu.

The film premiered on August 15, 2017 at the Sarajevo Film Festival where it Pârvu and Pavlu received the Heart of Sarajevo Award for Best Director and Heart of Sarajevo Award for Best Actor, respectively.   The film was theatrically released in Romania on November 24, 2017. At the 2018 Gopo Awards, Meda received nominations for Best Film, Best Actor (for Pavlu), Best Cinematography (for Silviu Stavilă) and Best Directorial Debut (for Pârvu), but won neither of them.

References

External links 
 

2017 films
2017 drama films
Romanian drama films
Films set in Romania
2017 directorial debut films